Song Gyo-sik (born 1925) was a South Korean athlete. He competed in the men's hammer throw at the 1956 Summer Olympics.

References

External links
  

1925 births
Possibly living people
Athletes (track and field) at the 1956 Summer Olympics
South Korean male hammer throwers
Olympic athletes of South Korea
Place of birth missing
Asian Games medalists in athletics (track and field)
Asian Games bronze medalists for South Korea
Athletes (track and field) at the 1954 Asian Games
Medalists at the 1954 Asian Games
20th-century South Korean people